Andrés Ayala may refer to:

 Andrés Ayala (footballer, born 1989), Uruguayan defender
 Andrés Ayala (footballer, born 2000), Argentine defensive midfielder